Braughing hundred was a judicial and taxation subdivision of Hertfordshire, in the east of the county, that existed from the 10th to the 19th century.

It comprised the following thirteen parishes: Bishop's Stortford, Braughing, Eastwick, Gilston, Hunsdon, Sawbridgeworth, Standon, Stanstead Abbots, Thorley, Thundridge, Ware, Westmill and Widford.

The hundred meeting point was at Braughing, which was one of the main Roman settlements in what is today Eastern Hertfordshire. The area was settled by the Saxon tribe called the Brahingas and became part of the area of the Middle Saxons within the Kingdom of Essex. When Christianity was introduced into Essex in 604, Braughing hundred became part of the Archdeaconry of Middlesex within the Diocese of East Saxons.

References 

Hundreds of Hertfordshire